The 1948 New South Wales Hundred was a motor race staged at the Mount Panorama Circuit near Bathurst in New South Wales, Australia on 29 March 1948.
The race, which was organised by the Australian Sporting Car Club, was contested on a handicap basis over 25 laps, a distance of 100 miles.

The race was won by John Barraclough driving an MG NE Magnette. A protest against Barraclough by the second placed driver, alleging inaccuracies in the entrance certificate, was dismissed.

Alf Barrett (Alfa Romeo) registered the fastest time for the 100 miles, setting a new record for this distance.
Barrett also set a new lap record.
Lex Davison (Alfa Romeo) attained a speed of 144 mph during the race. This was believed to be the fastest speed ever recorded on an Australian racing circuit to this time.

Results

Notes
 Starters: 25
 Finishers: 10
 Limit starter: Reg Ewing
 Scratch starter: Lex Davison
 Winner's average speed: Nearly 70 mph
 Fastest lap & new lap record: Alf Barrett, 3:01
 Fastest time: Alf Barrett, 80:47
 Attendance: Between 15,000 and 20,000

References

New South Wales Hundred
Motorsport in Bathurst, New South Wales
New South Wales Hundred